The 2013–14 Kategoria Superiore was the 75th official season (or 78th season overall, including three unofficial championships during World War II) of top-tier football in Albania  and the sixteenth season under the name Kategoria superiore. The season began on 31 August 2013 and ended on 10 May 2014.

Teams

Stadia and last season

Personnel and kits

Note: Flags indicate national team as has been defined under FIFA eligibility rules. Players and Managers may hold more than one non-FIFA nationality.

Managerial changes

League table

Results
The schedule consisted of three rounds. During the first two rounds, each team played each other once home and away for a total of 22 matches. The pairings of the third round were then set according to the standings after the first two rounds, giving every team a third game against each opponent for a total of 33 games per team.

First and second round

Third round

Season statistics

Scoring
First goal of the season: Renato Hyshmeri for Partizani Tirana against Kastrioti Krujë (31 August 2013)
 Largest winning margin: 6 goals
KF Laçi 6-0 Kastrioti Krujë (4 May 2014)
 Highest scoring game: 8 goals
Teuta Durrës 6-2 KS Lushnja (2 February 2014)
 Most goals scored in a match by a single team: 6 goals
Teuta Durrës 6-2 KS Lushnja (2 February 2014)
KF Laçi 6-0 Kastrioti Krujë (4 May 2014)
 Most goals scored in a match by a losing team: 3 goals
Flamurtari Vlorë 4-3 KS Lushnja (10 November 2013)

Top scorers

Hat-tricks

4 Player scored 4 goals

Clean sheets

Player

Attendances

Awards
Monthly awards

References

External links
 
Livescore

2013-14
Alb
1